The 2015 Guangzhou International Women's Open was a women's tennis tournament played on outdoor hard courts. It was the 12th edition of the Guangzhou International Women's Open, and part of the WTA International tournaments of the 2015 WTA Tour. It took place in Guangzhou, China, from September 22 through September 26, 2015.

Points and prize money

Prize money

1 Qualifiers prize money is also the Round of 32 prize money
* per team

Singles main-draw entrants

Seeds

 1 Rankings are as of September 14, 2015.

Other entrants
The following players received wildcards into the singles main draw:
  Wang Yafan
  Yang Zhaoxuan
  Zhang Shuai

The following players received entry from the qualifying draw:
  Ons Jabeur 
  Anett Kontaveit 
  Petra Martić 
  Rebecca Peterson 
  Wang Qiang 
  Zhang Kailin

Withdrawals
Before the tournament
  Margarita Gasparyan → replaced by  Yanina Wickmayer
  Olga Govortsova → replaced by  Duan Yingying

Doubles main-draw entrants

Seeds

 1 Rankings are as of September 14, 2015.

Champions

Singles

 Jelena Janković def.  Denisa Allertová, 6–2, 6–0

Doubles

 Martina Hingis /  Sania Mirza def.  Xu Shilin /  You Xiaodi, 6–3, 6–1

References

External links
 Official website

Guangzhou International Women's Open
Guangzhou International Women's Open
Guangzhou International Women's Open